The Rob Brydon Show was a British chat show hosted by comedian Rob Brydon. The first series started on 17 September 2010 and consists of six regular episodes, a compilation episode and a Christmas special. The second series had six regular episodes, a Christmas special and a compilation episode. The third and final series had six regular episodes.

Format
Each week, Brydon asks his Twitter followers to provide questions for his guests, which he asks after the comedian segment.  Brydon interviews two guests, who sit on his sofa while they chat; the musical guest performs at the end of the show (as well as possibly singing with Brydon during their segment). A comedian performs a short stint, with a short interview afterwards by Brydon.

The compilation episodes consist of previously unseen material. The first series compilation was set in the future, hosted by Brydon. The second series clips were hosted by Dai Young, a performer/publican from Wales and Brydon's alleged former comedy partner (in reality Brydon himself in costume).

Episode list

Series 1

Series 2

Series 3

Notes

References

External links

2010 British television series debuts
2012 British television series endings
BBC television comedy
BBC television talk shows
Television series by Fremantle (company)
Television shows shot at Teddington Studios